Where the Light Is may refer to:

 Where the Light Is (John Mayer album)
 Where the Light Is (Dan Bremnes album)
 Where the Light Is (EP), an EP by Dan Bremnes
 Where the Light Is, a 2019 album by Surfaces